Cozmic Jam is the only album by Dutch/Belgian electronic music collective Quadrophonia.

Track listing
"Quadrophonia"
"The Man with the Masterplan"
"Djoum 1000"
"Hardhead"
"Cozmic Jam"
"Find the Time (Part I)"
"Schizofrenia - The Worst Day of My Life"
"The Wave of the Future"
"Original Statement"
"Cozm' and Ovo"
"Quadrophonia (Remix)"
"The 9 Lives of Pitou"
"Find the Time (Part II)"
"Theme of Quadrophonia"

Charts

References

1991 albums
Quadrophonia albums